National Highway 148M, commonly referred to as NH 148M is a national highway in India. It is a secondary route of National Highway 48.  NH-148M runs in the state of Gujarat in India.

Route 
NH148M connects Vadodara, Bhaili, Samiyala, Laxmipura, Sangma, Padra, Dabhasa, Mahuvad, Kinkhlod, Pakiza Society in Borsad, Nisraya, Alarsa, Kosindra Indiranagar and Anklav in the state of Gujarat.

Junctions  
 
  Terminal near Vadodara.
  near Mahuvad

See also 
 List of National Highways in India
 List of National Highways in India by state

References

External links 

 NH 148M on OpenStreetMap

National highways in India
National Highways in Gujarat